Saltash South was an electoral division of Cornwall in the United Kingdom which returned one member to sit on Cornwall Council between 2013 and 2021. It was abolished at the 2021 local elections, being succeeded by Saltash Essa.

Councillors

Extent
Saltash South represented the south of the town of Saltash, including the suburb of Wearde and part of the suburb of St Stephens (which was shared with the Saltash West division). The division covered 125 hectares in total.

Election results

2017 election

2013 election

References

Electoral divisions of Cornwall Council